Monasterio de Santa María de Valdediós is a 13th-century Cistercian monastery near Villaviciosa of the autonomous community of the Principality of Asturias, in Spain. The monastery and town is on the coast of Biscay Bay in northern Spain.

It is a Site of Cultural Interest, the maximum category of heritage protection in Spanish legislation.

It contains the Iglesia de Santa María (Valdediós). The monastery is next to the Church of San Salvador de Valdediós.

The Spanish term Valdediós means God's valley in English.

History 
The monastery was established on November 27, 1200.  The stone buildings were built in the Spanish Gothic style

In 1522 it suffered a large flood from the Valdediós river.

References

External links 

 Official Monastery of Santa María de Valdediós website

13th-century Roman Catholic church buildings in Spain
Monasteries in Asturias
Gothic architecture in Asturias
Stone churches in Spain
1200s in Europe
12th-century establishments in the Kingdom of León
Christian monasteries established in the 13th century
Bien de Interés Cultural landmarks in Asturias